Vamsottharakar Temple is a Hindu temple dedicated to the deity Shiva, located at Perungalur in Pudukkottai taluk of Pudukkottai district in Tamil Nadu, India.

Location
This temple is located at a distance of 19 km from Pudukkottai in Pudukkottai-Thanjavur road. As there were many numbers of Mullai trees this place was called as 'Mullaivanam' and this place was renovated by Kulothunga Chola III, this was known as 'Cholalingapuram'.

Structure
In the west, temple tank is found. In between tank and the temple Vanni tree is found. Under the tree Vinayaka, Nāga and Aiyanar are found. In the prakara shrines of Vinayaka, Subramania,  Chandikesvarar, Dakshinamurthy, Durga and Bhairava are found. In the east, shrine of goddess is found. The shrine of Navagraha which was near to it earlier, is now set up in the prakara during renovation.

Presiding deity
The people of Perungalur worship the deity along with other two deities. After the fulfilment of their vows, for expressing their gratitude, they worship in the order of Urumanathar Temple, Malaiyamarungar Temple and lastly Vamsottharakar Temple. The presiding deity of this temple is known as Vamsottharakar and the goddess is known as Mangalanayaki. Kulothunga Chola III was without children. In order to beget children, he prayed to Shiva and was advised to set up two Lingas one facing east and another one facing west. He set up the Linga, facing west, in Perungalur and another Linga facing east in the west Cholalingapuram. He prayed Shiva in between these lingas and got two sons by the grace of the deity. So, the deity is known as Vamsottharakar and Kulotthunganagar.

Worshipping time
Pujas are held six times daily at Thiruvananthal (6.00 a.m.), Siru Kalasanthi (7.00 a.m.), Kalasanthi (9.00 a.m.), Uttchikkalam (noon 12.00), Sayaratchai (6.00 p.m.) and Arthajamam (8.00 p.m.). The temple is opened for worship from 6.00 to 12.00 noon and 5.00 to 8.30 p.m. Vaikasi visakam for 10 days, Adi Puram and other festivals are held in this temple.

References

Hindu temples in Pudukkottai district
Shiva temples in Pudukkottai district